Adriano Goldschmied is an Italian fashion designer who focuses on denim jeans. He is known as "the Godfather of denim" and is the originator of "premium denim". The founder of Diesel, he also created Replay, Gap 1969, Agolde, Goldsign, and AG Adriano Goldschmied. Goldschmied is currently the owner of House of Gold, a creative textile company with the purpose of bringing innovative fabrics to the market.

Biography
Goldschmied was born in 1944 in Trieste to an Ashkenazi Jewish family, 
whose assets were appropriated in 1942. Later, some of these assets were reconveyed to his family.

With initial dreams of becoming a competitive skier, he opened up a store in Cortina d'Ampezzo in 1970. This was a springboard for beginning his own denim company.

Since 1996, he has lived principally in Los Angeles and Milan.
His daughter, Marta Goldschmied, has launched her own denim line, MADE GOLD Denim.

The Indigo Move collection has 24 women's styles and 13 men's styles designed by Goldschmied in collaboration with Mavi. Available in all indigo shades, including ink, smoke, and black, the assortment introduces new silhouettes and fits for Mavi.

References

Living people
Fashion designers from Milan
Businesspeople from Trieste
20th-century Italian Jews
Jewish fashion designers
Year of birth missing (living people)